Drenovec pri Bukovju is a settlement in the Municipality of Brežice in eastern Slovenia. It lies in the hills above the right bank of the Sotla River, northeast of Bizeljsko, on the border with Croatia. The area is part of the traditional region of Lower Styria. It is now included with the rest of the municipality in the Lower Sava Statistical Region. The settlement includes the hamlets of Gornji Drenovec, Lipovec, Trnje, and Gornja Vas (in older sources Zgornja Vas).

Name
The name of the settlement was changed from Drenovec to Drenovec pri Bukovju in 1953. In the past the German name was Drenovetz.

References

External links
Drenovec pri Bukovju on Geopedia

Populated places in the Municipality of Brežice